Kimiko Date-Krumm was the defending champion, having won the event in 2012, but decided not to compete in 2013.

Top seed Jana Čepelová won the tournament, defeating wild card Maria Elena Camerin in the final, 6–1, 6–2.

Seeds

Main draw

Finals

Top half

Bottom half

References 
 Main draw

Al Habtoor Tennis Challenge - Singles
Al Habtoor Tennis Challenge
2013 in Emirati tennis